Kerson Huang (15 March 1928 – 1 September 2016) was a Chinese American theoretical physicist and translator.

Huang was born in Nanning, China and grew up in Manila, Philippines. He earned a B.S. and a Ph.D. in physics from the Massachusetts Institute of Technology (MIT) in 1950 and 1953, respectively. He served as an instructor at MIT from 1953 to 1955, and subsequently spent two years as a fellow at the Institute for Advanced Study. After returning to the MIT faculty in 1957, Huang became an authority on statistical physics, and worked on Bose–Einstein condensation and quantum field theory. At MIT, he had many PhD students in theoretical physics including Raymond G. Vickson who became a professor in Operations Research at the University of Waterloo. After retiring in 1999, he wrote on biophysics and was also a visiting professor at Nanyang Technological University in Singapore.  
 
Huang was best known to Chinese readers as the translator of the Rubaiyat of Omar Khayyam; while a graduate student in physics, he adapted Edward FitzGerald's famous adaptation into Classical Chinese verse. The book had been out of print for years, but was reprinted in Taiwan in 1989. With his wife Rosemary, Huang also translated the ancient divination text I Ching into English.

Huang died on 1 September 2016 at the age of 88.

Books 
 2016. A Superfluid Universe. Singapore: World Scientific Publishing. 
2014. 
 2007. Fundamental Forces of Nature: The Story of Gauge Fields. World Scientific. Aimed at educated lay readers.
 2005. Lectures on Statistical Physics and Protein Folding. World Scientific. 
 2001. Introduction to Statistical Physics. Taylor & Francis. 
 1998. Quantum Field Theory: From Operators to Path Integrals. John Wiley & Sons. ; 2nd revised and enlarged edition, 2010
 1992. Quarks, Leptons and Gauge Fields, 2nd ed. World Scientific. 
 1987. Statistical Mechanics, 2nd ed. John Wiley & Sons.
 1984. I Ching, the Oracle. World Scientific.

References

External links
Home page at MIT

1928 births
2016 deaths
20th-century Chinese translators
21st-century Chinese translators
English–Chinese translators
Chinese emigrants to the United States
Massachusetts Institute of Technology faculty
Academic staff of Tsinghua University
People from Nanning
Educators from Guangxi
Writers from Guangxi
Physicists from Guangxi
MIT Center for Theoretical Physics faculty
MIT Department of Physics alumni